HMS Lizard was a member of the standardize 20-gun sixth rates built at the end of the 17th Century. She was commissioned for service in the Bristol Channel, followed by the Irish Sea. She went missinging in the Mediterranean when she was lost with all hands in May 1696.

Lizard was the fourth ship to bear this name since it was used for a 120 builder's measure ship listed from 1512 to 1522.

Construction
She was ordered in the First Batch of four ships from Chatham Dockyard to be built under the guidance of their Master Shipwright, Robert Lee. She was launched on 19 March 1694.

Commissioned Service
She was commissioned on 22 January 1694 under the command of Captain William Caldwell, RN for service in the Bristol Channel. Just over a year later, Captain Joseph Welby, RN assumed command on 26 February 1695. She maintained her service in the Briston Channel before moving into the Irish Sea. In 1696 she was assigned to the Mediterranean. Shortly after arriving in the Mediterranean she went missing.

Loss
HMS Lizard was lost with all hands off Toulon on 31 May 1696.

Citations

References
 Winfield, British Warships in the Age of Sail (1603 – 1714), by Rif Winfield, published by Seaforth Publishing, England © 2009, EPUB , Chapter 6, The Sixth Rates, Vessels acquired from 18 December 1688, Sixth Rates of 20 guns and up to 26 guns, Maidstone Group, Lizard
 Colledge, Ships of the Royal Navy, by J.J. Colledge, revised and updated by Lt Cdr Ben Warlow and Steve Bush, published by Seaforth Publishing, Barnsley, Great Britain, © 2020, e  (EPUB), Section L (Lizard)

 

1690s ships
Corvettes of the Royal Navy
Ships built in Chatham
Naval ships of the United Kingdom